Highway 131 was a provincially maintained highway in the Canadian province of Ontario, located in Simcoe County and the city of Barrie. The route, which connected Highway 27 with Highway 90, existed from 1984 until 1998, after which it was transferred to the responsibility of Simcoe County.
Highway131 was a straight rural highway, located west of Barrie's suburban fringe, though since then those suburbs have grown out to reach the former highway. Otherwise, the highway is abutted by the occasional farm and surrounded by several forests.

Route description 

Highway 131 began at an intersection with Highway 27 (Essa Road), travelling north through the outskirts of Barrie. Although the city of 125,000 residents lay immediately east of the highway, Highway 131 was a two lane road throughout its length. North of Highway 27, the route travelled north through farmland, then west of the suburb of Holly. North of Mapleview Drive, the route entered a forested area. After travelling through a valley, the highway met Ardagh Road. It crossed the newly commissioned Barrie Collingwood Railway and shortly thereafter ended at Highway 90 (Dunlop Street), which travelled east to Barrie and west to Angus and CFB Borden.

History 
In 1984 or 1985, the Ministry of Transportation of Ontario (MTO) assumed ownership of Simcoe County Road31.
The purpose was to divert Georgian Bay and Wasaga Beach -bound traffic from Highway 26 in Downtown Barrie. Highway131 remained unchanged throughout its existence.

As part of a series of budget cuts initiated by premier Mike Harris under his Common Sense Revolution platform in 1995, numerous highways deemed to no longer be of significance to the provincial network were decommissioned and responsibility for the routes transferred to a lower level of government, a process referred to as downloading. Highway131 was downloaded in its entirety on January1, 1998, and responsibility for the maintenance and signing of the route transferred to the County of Simcoe and City of Barrie.
The route was redesignated as Simcoe County Road 27; the former route of Highway27 into Barrie is now known as Essa Road.

Major intersections

See also 
 York Regional Road 27

References 

Roads in Simcoe County
Ontario county roads
131